Elvis is the soundtrack album for American rock and roll singer Elvis Presley's 1968 television special of the same title, released by RCA Records. It was recorded live at NBC Studios in Burbank, California, with additional studio work taking place at Western Recorders, in June 1968. The album peaked at #8 on the Billboard 200; along with the TV special, it revitalized Presley's career after years of diminishing commercial and critical success. It was certified Gold on July 22, 1969 and Platinum on July 15, 1999 by the RIAA.

Content
The live album from the Elvis special is the audio-only version of the special, and consists of a mixture of studio and live recordings, the live material itself a mixture of "sit-down" tracks with a small group and "stand-up" tracks with an orchestra.

Unlike the drudgery of the feature film soundtrack recordings, Presley was genuinely excited by the project. For the album, the musical format presented Presley in three different settings: production numbers featuring medleys of his material; an informal small band featuring full songs in front of a live audience; and the two original numbers with Presley backed by an orchestra in front of a live audience. The two ballad tracks from this album were issued as singles. "If I Can Dream" being released earlier in the month, backed on the B-side with a song from his movie in theaters at the time, Live a Little, Love a Little, making it a double promotion on one record. It peaked at #12 on the Billboard Hot 100, his highest charting single since 1965. "Memories" was released over two months after the broadcast, backed with the title song to his next film, Charro!. By making it to the top ten on the album chart after his previous album had charted at a dismal #82, this LP resuscitated his recording career at a time when it seemed practically moribund. Presley insisted the mono mixes for these songs were retained for the album.

Reissues
Several hours of music were recorded for the special, and the unused material has been reissued in many different formats over the years.

On August 27, 1991, RCA released an expanded version for compact disc, NBC-TV Special, including unedited versions of the medleys in several cases. 
Two extensive compact disc releases appeared in 1998, Memories: The '68 Comeback Special featuring more comprehensive versions of the production and orchestral numbers, along with the complete first informal small band show of June 27, and Tiger Man featuring the complete evening show of the two informal small band concerts of June 27, 1968. (Both small band shows would be issued on vinyl as The King in the Ring for Record Store Day 2018.)
On August 5, 2008, Legacy released The Complete '68 Comeback Special, a 4-CD compilation of the complete recording sessions for the special. It was later expanded and re-issued as  '68 Comeback Special - 50th Anniversary Edition on November 30, 2018, adding new stereo mixes of "Memories" and "If I Can Dream" as well as a bonus disc of sessions and alternate takes and two blu-rays worth of video.

Track listing

Original release

1991 CD reissue

Memories

The Complete '68 Comeback Special

Personnel

on June 20–23, 29 1968
 Elvis Presley – vocals, rhythm guitar
 The Blossoms – backing vocals
 Tommy Morgan – harmonica
 Mike Deasy – electric guitar
 Al Casey – electric guitar
 Tommy Tedesco – electric guitar
 Larry Knechtel – keyboards, bass guitar
 Don Randi – piano
 Charles Berghofer – double bass
 Hal Blaine – drums
 John Cyr, Elliot Franks – percussion 
 Frank DeVito – bongo 
 Billy Goldenberg – orchestra conductor

on June 27, 1968
 Elvis Presley – vocals, acoustic and electric rhythm guitars, lead guitar
 Scotty Moore – acoustic guitar, lead guitar
 Charlie Hodge – acoustic guitar, harmony and backing vocals
 D.J. Fontana – percussion
Alan Fortas – percussion
 Lance LeGault – tambourine

Charts

Album

Certifications and sales

References
Jorgensen, Ernst. Elvis Presley A Life in Music: The Complete Recording Sessions. New York: St. Martin's Press, 1998;

External links

LPM-4088 Elvis (a.k.a. Elvis' TV Special, Elvis' Comeback Special, or Elvis' NBC-TV Special) at The Elvis Presley Record Research Database

Elvis Presley live albums
1968 albums
Albums produced by Bones Howe
Albums conducted by Billy Goldenberg